West Bengal Handicrafts Development Corporation popularly known as Manjusha is an agency of Government of West Bengal established in 1976, to develop, preserve and promote the rich tradition of exquisite craftsmanship of West Bengal. It is under the administrative control of Micro & Small Scale Enterprises and Textiles Department, Government of West Bengal.

References

State agencies of West Bengal
Culture of West Bengal
State handicrafts development corporations of India
Government agencies established in 1976
1976 establishments in West Bengal
 3. WEST BENGAL HANDICRAFTS DEVELOPMENT CORPN LTD
 4. https://timesofindia.indiatimes.com/city/kolkata/kolkata-saras-mela-sales-boost-for-artisans/articleshow/80196872.cms